The 1938 All-Eastern football team consists of American football players chosen by various selectors as the best players at each position among the Eastern colleges and universities during the 1938 college football season.

All-Eastern selections

Quarterbacks
 Sid Luckman, Columbia (AP-1)

Halfbacks
 Bob MacLeod, Dartmouth (AP-1)
 Marshall Goldberg, Pittsburgh (AP-1)

Fullbacks
 Bill Osmanski, Holy Cross (AP-1)

Ends
 Jerome H. Holland, Cornell (AP-1)
 Bill Daddio, Pittsburgh (AP-1)

Tackles
 Joe Delaney, Holy Cross (AP-1)
 Bill McKeever, Cornell (AP-1)

Guards
 A. Sidney Roth, Cornell (AP-1)
 Steve Petro, Pittsburgh (AP-1)

Centers
 Bob Gibson, Dartmouth (AP-1)

Key
 AP = Associated Press
 NEA = Newspaper Enterprise Association
 AK = Andrew Kerr
 PW = Pop Warner

See also
 1938 College Football All-America Team

References

All-Eastern
All-Eastern college football teams